Archeological Site No. 142-14 is a historic site and camp in Ripogenus, Maine. It is part of the Penobscot Headwater Lakes Prehistoric Sites and was added to the National Register of Historic Places on October 31, 1995.

References

		
National Register of Historic Places in Piscataquis County, Maine